North Fork Reservoir is a reservoir behind North Fork Dam, on the Clackamas River, upriver from Estacada.

Location and construction

North Fork is in Clackamas County, Oregon, and is located five miles upriver from Estacada. The dam was built in 1958.

Named for

North Fork Reservoir was named for the North Fork of the Clackamas that flows into the lake.

Nearby dams

It is near River Mill Hydroelectric Project and Faraday Dam. Portland General Electric operates all dams and related infrastructure.

Fishing

North Fork is a popular fishing area.

Recreation

North Fork is near Portland, Oregon, is easily accessible, and is a popular recreation area. It is also a popular boating area.

See also

 List of lakes in Oregon

References

Reservoirs in Oregon
Lakes of Clackamas County, Oregon
1958 establishments in Oregon